The 2019–20 Clemson Tigers women's basketball team represented Clemson University during the 2019–20 college basketball season. The Tigers were led by second year head coach Amanda Butler. The Tigers, members of the Atlantic Coast Conference, played their home games at Littlejohn Coliseum.

The Tigers finished the season 8–23 and 3–15 in ACC play to finish in fourteenth place.  As the fourteenth seed in the ACC tournament, they defeated Miami in the First Round before losing to Boston College in the Second Round.  The NCAA tournament and WNIT were cancelled due to the COVID-19 outbreak.

Following the conclusion of the 2019–20 season, senior Kobi Thornton was drafted in the third round of the WNBA draft (27th overall) by the Atlanta Dream.

Previous season
The Tigers finished the 2018–19 season 20–13, 9–7 in ACC play to finish in seventh place. They lost to Louisville in the quarterfinals of the ACC tournament.  They received an at-large bid to the NCAA women's tournament—which was their first trip since 2002—where they defeated South Dakota in the first round before losing to Mississippi State in the second round.

Offseason

Departures

2019 recruiting class

Source:

Roster
Source:

Schedule
Source: 

|-
!colspan=9 style="background:#522D80; color:#F66733;"| Exhibition

|-
!colspan=9 style="background:#522D80; color:#F66733;"| Regular Season

|-
!colspan=9 style="background:#522D80; color:#F66733;"| ACC Women's Tournament

Rankings

See also
 2019–20 Clemson Tigers men's basketball team

References

Clemson Tigers women's basketball seasons
Clemson
Clemson Tigers
Clemson Tigers